Frits Zernike  (16 July 1888 – 10 March 1966) was a Dutch physicist and winner of the Nobel Prize in Physics in 1953 for his invention of the phase-contrast microscope.

Early life and education 
Frits Zernike was born on 16 July 1888 in Amsterdam, Netherlands to Carl Friedrich August Zernike and Antje Dieperink. Both parents were teachers of mathematics, and he especially shared his father's passion for physics. He studied chemistry (his major), mathematics and physics at the University of Amsterdam.

Academic career 
In 1912, he was awarded a prize for his work on opalescence in gases. In 1913, he became assistant to Jacobus Kapteyn at the astronomical laboratory of Groningen University. In 1914, Zernike and Leonard Ornstein were jointly responsible for the derivation of the Ornstein–Zernike equation in critical-point theory. In 1915, he became lector in theoretical mechanics and mathematical physics at the same university and in 1920 he was promoted to professor of mathematical physics.

In 1930, Zernike was conducting research into spectral lines when he discovered that the so-called ghost lines that occur to the left and right of each primary line in spectra created by means of a diffraction grating, have their phase shifted from that of the primary line by 90 degrees. It was at a Physical and Medical Congress in Wageningen in 1933, that Zernike first described his phase contrast technique in microscopy. He extended his method to test the figure of concave mirrors. His discovery lay at the base of the first phase contrast microscope, built during World War II.

He also made another contribution in the field of optics, relating to the efficient description of the imaging defects or aberrations of optical imaging systems like microscopes and telescopes. The representation of aberrations was originally  based on the theory developed by Ludwig Seidel in the middle of the nineteenth century. Seidel's representation was based on power series expansions and did not allow a clear separation between various types and orders of aberrations. Zernike's orthogonal circle polynomials provided a solution to the long-standing problem of the optimum 'balancing' of the various aberrations of an optical instrument. Since the 1960s, Zernike's circle polynomials are widely used in optical design, optical metrology and image analysis.

Zernike's work helped awaken interest in coherence theory, the study of partially coherent light sources. In 1938 he published a simpler derivation of Van Cittert's 1934 theorem on the coherence of radiation from distant sources, now known as the Van Cittert–Zernike theorem.

Death 
He died in hospital in Amersfoort in 1966 after suffering illness the last years of his life. His granddaughter is journalist Kate Zernike.

Honours and awards 
In 1946, Zernike became member of the Royal Netherlands Academy of Arts and Sciences.

In 1953, Zernike won the Nobel Prize in Physics, for his invention of the phase-contrast microscope, an instrument that permits the study of internal cell structure without the need to stain and thus kill the cells.

In 1954, Zernike became an Honorary Member of The Optical Society (OSA). Zernike was elected a Foreign Member of the Royal Society (ForMemRS).

The university complex (Zernike Campus) to the north of the city of Groningen is named after him, as is the crater Zernike on the Moon.

Zernike's great-nephew Gerard 't Hooft won the Nobel Prize in Physics in 1999.

The Oz Enterprise, a Linux distribution, was named after Leonard Ornstein and Frederik Zernike.

See also
 Leonard Ornstein
 Coherence theory
 Fourier optics
 Live cell imaging
 Optical aberration
 Phase-contrast X-ray imaging
 Physical optics

References

External links

 Frits Zernike Photo
  including his Nobel Lecture, December 11, 1953 How I discovered phase contrast
 Extended Nijboer–Zernike theory
 Museum Boerhaave Negen Nederlandse Nobelprijswinnaars
 H. Brinkman, Zernike, Frits (1888–1966), in Biografisch Woordenboek van Nederland.
 Prominente Groningse hoogleraren Frits Zernike (1888–1966)
 Frits Zernike (1888–1966) biography at the National library of the Netherlands.
 The Ornstein-Zernike equation and integral equations
 Multilevel wavelet solver for the Ornstein-Zernike equation Abstract
 Analytical solution of the Ornstein-Zernike equation for a multicomponent fluid
The Ornstein-Zernike equation in the canonical ensemble

1888 births
1966 deaths
20th-century Dutch inventors
Dutch Nobel laureates
20th-century Dutch physicists
Foreign Members of the Royal Society
Members of the Royal Netherlands Academy of Arts and Sciences
Microscopists
Nobel laureates in Physics
Scientists from Amsterdam
University of Amsterdam alumni
Academic staff of the University of Groningen